The 25pdr SP, tracked, Sexton was a Canadian-designed self-propelled artillery vehicle of the Second World War. It was based on Canadian-built derivatives of the American M3 Lee and M4 Sherman tank chassis. Canada had set up to produce the Ram tank using the M3 chassis and Grizzly (a copy of the M4) to complement US medium tank production; when Sherman production in the US expanded and supply was no longer a problem, it was decided in 1943 to switch the Canadian production lines to produce the Sexton to give the British Army a mobile artillery gun using their  Ordnance QF 25-pounder gun-howitzer for commonality with towed guns. The Sexton could fire either HE shell or an armour-piercing shell. 
It found use in the Canadian and British Army, as well as numerous other British Empire and associated forces. Just after the war, a number of Grizzly and Sextons were sold to Portugal, who used them into the 1980s.

History
In order to better provide artillery support in the highly mobile desert warfare of the North African Campaign, the British Army had quickly adapted a number of obsolete Valentine tanks with the 25-pounder gun. These were introduced in 1942 as the Bishop, but proved to have many problems in service. In particular, the turret left little room for elevation, and gunners took to driving their tanks onto hills or dirt ramps in order to get the full range out of the gun. The Bishop was quickly replaced by the US-built M7 Priest, consisting of the US 105 mm gun mounted on the M3 Lee tank chassis. The M7 supplied under Lend-Lease reaching service in October 1942. In March 1942, the UK had ordered 2,500 for 1942 with another 3,000 for 1943. The first M7s were rushed to Egypt for the Second Battle of El Alamein where they played an important part

However, the Priest used the American 105 mm howitzer which was not in use in other British units. Having to supply different ammunition for just a few units complicated supply for the British Army. The British General Staff requirement was for a vehicle with mobility and characteristics of the M7 but with the 25 pounder gun-howitzer. The US attempted to fit a 25 pounder to the M7 Priest, producing the "25 pounder Howitzer Motor Carriage T51" in July 1942, but the program suffered delays including the destruction of the gun mount on the prototype during the first live-firing exercises.

US resources were not available for a vehicle solely for British use, so Britain turned to Canada. The Canadian Army Engineering Design Branch through the Canadian government's Department of Munitions and Supply were asked to build a vehicle similar to the M7 on the Ram tank chassis. The Ram tank was a Canadian tank design that used the chassis of the American Medium Tank M3 the same as the Priest. The Ram had been sidelined by a decision to standardize on the Sherman tank for British and Canadian units. A prototype was completed on 23 June 1942. Following trials in Canada, the Canadian government ordered 124 vehicles in three batches. The prototype was shipped to the United Kingdom in early 1943, where it underwent further trials; the vehicle was found to be highly satisfactory and was given the designation "Sexton" (after the religious custodian and following in the tradition of the Bishop and the Deacon self-propelled guns) in May 1943. The British government ordered 300 Sextons in the summer of 1943; however, these Sextons were to be built on Grizzly tank hulls (Canadian-built M4A1 Sherman tanks) instead of Ram tank hulls. The Ram-based Sexton was designated as the Sexton Mark I and the Grizzly-based Sexton was designated the Sexton Mark II. British orders for the Sexton II eventually totalled 2,026 vehicles.

Unlike the Ram, which was inferior operationally to the Sherman and never saw combat as a gun tank, the Sexton was successful. Between 1943 and 1945, the Montreal Locomotive Works manufactured a total of 2,150 Sextons for the use of both Canadian and British forces. The vehicle entered service in September 1943. In spite of its confused origins, the Sexton was a combination of proven parts and proved to be a successful design that remained in British service until 1956.

Operational service
The vehicles were first used in combat in Italy by the British Eighth Army. Later, Sextons took part in the invasion of France and subsequent Battle of Normandy and the campaign in north-western Europe. During the D-day landings, a number of Sextons were ordered to fire from their landing craft as they approached the beaches although the fire did not prove to be very accurate. After the war a number of units were equipped with the Sexton as part of the British Army of the Rhine (BAOR).

The following units were equipped with the Sexton at different periods:

1st Regiment Royal Horse Artillery, Italy 1944-45, post-war (Sexton withdrawn in 1956)
2nd Regiment, Royal Horse Artillery, Italy 1944-45, post-war (Sexton withdrawn in 1957)
3rd Regiment Royal Horse Artillery, post-war
4/22 Field Regiment (South African Irish and Transvaal Horse Artillery), South African Artillery, 6th South African Armoured Division, Italy 1944-45 (01/1944 - 08/1944 then replaced by the M7 Priest when the Division transferred to US IV Corps US 5th Army )
5th Regiment Royal Horse Artillery, North West Europe 1944–45; post-war
 6th Field (Self Propelled) Regiment, Royal Artillery, post-war
 10th Field Regiment, Royal Artillery, post-war
13th (HAC) Regiment, Royal Horse Artillery, North West Europe 1944-45
86th (East Anglian) (Hertfordshire Yeomanry) Field Regiment, Royal Artillery, North West Europe 1944-45
90th(City of London) Field Regiment, Royal Artillery, North West Europe 1944-45
98th Field Regiment (Surrey & Sussex Yeomanry Queen Mary's), Royal Artillery, North west Europe 1945
147th (Essex Yeomanry) Field Regiment, Royal Artillery, North West Europe 1944-45
153rd (Leicestershire Yeomanry) Field Regiment, Royal Artillery, North West Europe 1944-45

British and Canadian forces used the Sexton for indirect supporting fire, keeping the Sextons back from the front line and used forward observers to direct overwhelming fire onto a target.

The Indian 1st and 2nd Field Artillery Regiments used Sextons after World War II.

Variants
Sexton I: The first 125 vehicles manufactured. Based on the Ram tank hull.
Sexton II: It featured boxes added to the rear deck to carry batteries and an auxiliary generator to charge them. Based on the Grizzly (M4A1 Sherman) hull.
Sexton GPO (Gun Position Officer): The 25 pounder was removed and an extra No. 19 Wireless was added along with map tables; this vehicle was used to control battery fire.

British self-propelled gun naming
A British self-propelled gun armed with the Ordnance QF 25-pounder in design from 1941 was given the service name "Bishop" as its appearance was said to resemble a bishop's mitre. A replacement, the US 105mm Howitzer Motor Carriage M7 was called "Priest" by the British, as part of its superstructure was said to resemble a priest's pulpit. Following this line of names, a 1942 self-propelled QF 6 pounder on armoured truck chassis was named "Deacon". A post-war self-propelled gun was called Abbot.

See also

 Yeramba - an Australian armoured vehicle of the 1950s mounting of 25-pounder on an M3 hull.

References

Sources
 Chris Ellis, Peter Chamberlain - AFV No. 13 - Ram and Sexton, Profile Publications, England

External links

 World War II vehicles
 Juno Beach Centre

World War II self-propelled artillery
World War II armoured fighting vehicles of Canada
World War II armoured fighting vehicles of the United Kingdom
Self-propelled artillery of the United Kingdom
Military vehicles introduced from 1940 to 1944
M4 Sherman tanks